Aulosepalum is a genus of flowering plants from the orchid family, Orchidaceae. It consists of 8 species native to Mexico and Central America.

Aulosepalum hemichrea (Lindl.) Garay - Oaxaca, Chiapas, El Salvador, Guatemala, Honduras, Nicaragua 
Aulosepalum nelsonii (Greenm.) Garay - Michoacán, Oaxaca
Aulosepalum oestlundii (Burns-Bal.) Catling - Guerrero
Aulosepalum pulchrum (Schltr.) Catling - Guatemala and southern Mexico
Aulosepalum pyramidale (Lindl.) M.A.Dix & M.W.Dix - from central Mexico to Costa Rica
Aulosepalum ramentaceum (Lindl.) Garay - Tamaulipas, San Luis Potosí
Aulosepalum riodelayense (Burns-Bal.) Salazar - Oaxaca
Aulosepalum tenuiflorum (Greenm.) Garay - Morelos, Guerrero

See also 
 List of Orchidaceae genera

References 

 Pridgeon, A.M., Cribb, P.J., Chase, M.A. & Rasmussen, F. eds. (1999). Genera Orchidacearum 1. Oxford Univ. Press.
 Pridgeon, A.M., Cribb, P.J., Chase, M.A. & Rasmussen, F. eds. (2001). Genera Orchidacearum 2. Oxford Univ. Press.
 Pridgeon, A.M., Cribb, P.J., Chase, M.A. & Rasmussen, F. eds. (2003). Genera Orchidacearum 3. Oxford Univ. Press
 Berg Pana, H. 2005. Handbuch der Orchideen-Namen. Dictionary of Orchid Names. Dizionario dei nomi delle orchidee. Ulmer, Stuttgart

External links 

IOSPE photos, Aulosepalum pyramidale 
Andy's Orchids (Encinitas California USA), Aulosepalum nelsonii
Orquídeas Mexicanas, Aulosepalum pyramidale = Kionophyton pyramidalis 
Orchidées in-situ du Mexique - Temascaltepec - Aulosepalum pyramidale

Cranichideae genera
Spiranthinae
Orchids of Mexico
Orchids of Central America
Taxa named by Leslie Andrew Garay